Mazatec may refer to: 
Mazatec people, indigenous inhabitants of Sierra Mazateca in Northern Oaxaca, Mexico
Mazatecan languages, the subgroup of the Oto-Manguean languages spoken by those people